German submarine U-576 was a Type VIIC U-boat of Nazi Germany's Kriegsmarine during World War II. She was sunk on 15 July 1942 by depth charges from two US aircraft and gunfire from a merchant ship, near the East Coast of the United States. The wreck was discovered in August 2014.

Design
German Type VIIC submarines were preceded by the shorter Type VIIB submarines. U-576 had a displacement of  when at the surface and  while submerged. She had two shafts and two  propellers.

U-576 was fitted with five  torpedo tubes (four fitted at the bow and one at the stern), fourteen torpedoes, one  SK C/35 naval gun, 220 rounds, and a  C/30 anti-aircraft gun. The boat had a complement of between forty-four and sixty men.

Service history
Laid down on 1 August 1940 at Blohm & Voss, Hamburg at yard number 552, the submarine was launched on 30 April 1941. She was commissioned on 26 June under the command of Kapitänleutnant Hans-Dieter Heinicke.

U-576 trained in the 7th U-boat Flotilla, and stayed with that flotilla for operations from 1 September 1941 until her loss on 15 July 1942.

First and second patrols
U-576s first patrol was from Kirkenes in Norway. She headed for the Barents Sea and swept the area off the Kola Peninsula. No encounters were reported.

On her second patrol, she sailed into the Atlantic Ocean through the gap separating the Faroe and Shetland Islands. She arrived at St. Nazaire in occupied France on 23 December 1941, without incident.

Third patrol
Leaving St. Nazaire on 20 January 1942, the U-576 sank the Empire Spring, a catapult armed merchantman or CAM ship, on 14 February, southeast of Sable Island, off Nova Scotia. The Empire Spring entire crew of 55 died in the sinking.

Fourth patrol
All 46 of the Pipestone County crewmen survived. The submarine surfaced, Heinicke apologized to the Pipestone County crew for sinking their ship, and U-576 crew gave provisions to the men in one of the lifeboats. The merchant ship went down in just one minute, with the loss of 17 of her 20 crewmen.

Fifth patrol and loss
The boat set out from St. Nazaire for the last time on 16 June 1942, heading for the U.S. Atlantic seaboard to participate in Operation Drumbeat. During the first half of July, she sighted an Allied convoy but was unable to attack it. The U-576 was plagued with engine trouble, and on 13 or 14 July, an aircraft attack damaged one of her ballast tanks, hampering her ability to dive and surface, and Heinicke signaled that the damage could not be repaired at sea. On the 29th day of the patrol, Heinicke signaled that he was heading east on the surface in moderate seas and had made 16 nautical miles that day. It was the U-576 last signal.

On 15 July 1942 off the coast of North Carolina, the U-576 encountered Convoy KS-520, which consisted of 19 merchant ships and five escorts steaming from Hampton Roads, Virginia, to Key West, Florida. She fired four torpedoes; one hit and sank the Nicaraguan cargo ship Bluefields, one hit and damaged the American cargo ship Chilore that then struck an Allied mine whilst under tow and sank off Cape Henry, while the other two hit the Panamanian tanker J. A. Mowinckel, damaging her. After firing the torpedoes, the U-576 unintentionally surfaced in the middle of the convoy, prompting one of the convoy's ships, the Unicoi, to open fire on her and two United States Navy Vought OS2U Kingfisher aircraft to attack her with depth charges, one of which was seen to land on her deck and roll overboard before exploding. The U-576 sank, leaving a large pool of oil on the surface. All 45 crewmen on U-576 died; there were no survivors.

Discovery

In 2009, the U.S. National Oceanic and Atmospheric Administration's Office of Ocean Exploration and Research, the University of North Carolina's Coastal Studies Institute, and the United States Department of the Interior's Bureau of Ocean Energy Management launched a joint effort to find the wreck of U-576. An unsuccessful attempt to locate the sunken vessel off Cape Hatteras was documented in the National Geographic Channel's 2013 television documentary Hitler's Secret Attack on America. In October 2014, NOAA announced the submarine had been located using sonar in August 2014 during an expedition conducted by NOAA's Office of Marine Sanctuaries. On 8 December 2015 the wrecks of U-576 and Bluefields were placed on the National Register of Historic Places.

On 24 August 2016, during a series of dives in two-person submersibles from the  vessel Baseline Explorer, scientists working in partnership with Project Baseline, the University of North Carolina Coastal Studies Institute, and SRI International made the first visual observations of U-576 since her sinking in 1942. Its wooden deck had rotted away, but its hull, conning tower, and deck gun (the latter inscribed with the nickname "Peterle," German for "Little Peter") were largely intact. The scientists also visited the wreck of Bluefields. NOAA made plans to conduct an underwater laser scan of both wrecks and produce exact three-dimensional models of them.

Under maritime law, the wreck of U-576 is the property of the German government. The United States Government has agreed to care for it. Presumably, her entire crew of 45 men is entombed within her hull.

Summary of raiding history

References

Bibliography

External links

German Type VIIC submarines
U-boats commissioned in 1941
U-boats sunk in 1942
U-boats sunk by US aircraft
U-boats sunk by US warships
U-boats sunk by depth charges
1941 ships
Ships built in Hamburg
Ships lost with all hands
World War II submarines of Germany
World War II shipwrecks in the Atlantic Ocean
Shipwrecks on the National Register of Historic Places in North Carolina
National Register of Historic Places in Dare County, North Carolina
World War II on the National Register of Historic Places
Shipwrecks of the Carolina coast
Maritime incidents in July 1942